Jan Košek (11 January 1914 – 7 March 1979) was a Czech ice hockey player. He competed in the men's tournament at the 1936 Winter Olympics.

References

External links
 

1914 births
1979 deaths
Czech ice hockey defencemen
Olympic ice hockey players of Czechoslovakia
Ice hockey players at the 1936 Winter Olympics
Ice hockey people from Prague
Czechoslovak ice hockey defencemen
HC Sparta Praha players
HC Slavia Praha players